Sinan Zorlu (born 8 March 1995) is a Turkish badminton player. He competed at the 2015 European Games.

Achievements

BWF International Challenge/Series 
Men's doubles

Mixed doubles

  BWF International Challenge tournament
  BWF International Series tournament
  BWF Future Series tournament

References

External links 
 

Living people
1995 births
People from Osmangazi
Sportspeople from Bursa
Turkish male badminton players
Badminton players at the 2015 European Games
European Games competitors for Turkey